French News was a monthly newspaper, based in Périgueux, Dordogne, France, published in English and distributed mostly in France.

History
June 1987, start of the French News newspaper, (Known as "The News" back then) in Chancelade. Chancelade at "fr.wikipedia"

February 1995, S.A.R.L. French News (company) was founded.

May 1997, two tourist guides by the French News, "The Limousin" and "The Dordogne", were started. (Six more were later published.)

1998, S.A.R.L. French News moved to Périgueux.

December 2008, S.A.R.L. French News declared insolvency and entered liquidation.

In July 2010, some of the team involved in French News started a new weekly newspaper, French Week.  This too went insolvent after a few months and both the printed and internet versions closed down in liquidation.

French-News-Online.com an entirely web-based successor was launched in 2010 by a team with no relationship whatsoever to those responsible for the two earlier failed ventures.

References

1987 establishments in France
2008 disestablishments in France
Defunct monthly newspapers
Defunct newspapers published in France
English-language newspapers published in France
Newspapers established in 1987
Publications disestablished in 2008